Heroic Times is a 1984 Hungarian animated historical epic film directed by József Gémes. It is an adaptation of the Toldi trilogy, a 19th-century epic poem in three parts by János Arany. The film was produced through Pannonia Film Studio and is notable for its visual style, which resembles oil painting. It won the feature film award at the 1985 Annecy International Animated Film Festival.

See also
 Miklós Toldi

References

External links
 

1980s fantasy adventure films
1984 films
1984 animated films
Hungarian animated films
Hungarian fantasy films
1980s Hungarian-language films
Annecy Cristal for a Feature Film winners